Thomas Kelley is an American college athletics administrator and college football coach. He is the athletic director and head football coach at Framingham State University. Kelley has been the school's athletic director since 1985 and has served as head football coach at Framingham State from 1982 to 1984, 2007 to 2019, and 2021 to present, compiling a record of 115–62–1.

Head coaching record

References

External links
 Framingham State profile

Year of birth missing (living people)
Living people
American football defensive tackles
Framingham State Rams athletic directors
Framingham State Rams football coaches
Framingham State Rams football players